Sami Solh or Sami El Solh (1887–1968) was a Lebanese Sunni Muslim politician. He was a relative of former Lebanese prime ministers Riad Solh, Takieddine Solh and Rachid Solh. He served as Prime Minister of Lebanon five times (1942–43, 1945–46, 1952, 1954–55, and 1956–58).

Biography
Solh was born into a Sunni family in 1887. He grew up in Turkey, Greece, and Lebanon.

Solh survived many assassination attempts two of which occurred on 20 April and 29 July 1958 while he was serving as the prime minister. He also held the portfolio of defense minister in 1957 and 1958.

Solh married Balqis Rida Solh who was the sister of the Prime Minister Riad Solh. He spoke French, Arabic, Greek and Turkish.

Honours
One of the most prominent avenues in Beirut, next to the Ministry of Justice, is named Boulevard Sami El Solh. In 2018, a Lebanese stamp was created dedicated to the prime minister.

 Knight Grand Cross of the Imperial Order of the Yoke and Arrows of Francoist Spain (1 April 1952)

References

External links

1887 births
1968 deaths
Lebanese Sunni Muslims
Prime Ministers of Lebanon
Defense ministers of Lebanon
Survivors of terrorist attacks
National Liberal Party (Lebanon) politicians

Al Solh family